Moanalua High School (also known as MoHS) is a public, co-educational college preparatory high school of the Hawaii State Department of Education, located in Honolulu CDP, City & County of Honolulu, Hawaii.

Serving grades nine through twelve and established in 1972, Moanalua High School is located in suburban Salt Lake near Moanalua. Its first class graduated in 1975. The school is situated on an extinct volcano hillside overlooking downtown Honolulu at 2825 Ala Ilima Street.  The campus boasts the copper sculpture Moanalua by Bumpei Akaji and the ceramic sculpture Silent Sounds by Shigeharu Yamada.

In May 2012 Tiffany Hill of Honolulu Magazine wrote that the school had "high-caliber programs" and a strong curriculum. Hill stated that some programs are "nationally recognized". In 2004 James Gonser of the Honolulu Advertiser wrote that the school had "A reputation for success".

Moanalua High School underwent reaccreditation by Western Association of Schools and Colleges and has achieved the maximum accreditation term of six years, 2012-2018 and once again in 2019-2024.

Robin Martin heads the school as principal.

Origins
An ahupuaa in ancient Hawaii was a parcel of land that stretched from the mountain to the sea. The ahupuaa of Moanalua was the property of wealthy landowner Samuel M. Damon.

Previous to Damon's ownership of the Salt Lake ahupuaa, the volcanic hillside on which Moanalua High School sits was used by native Hawaiians in the Hawaiian religion. As one of the highest points overlooking what would later become the city of Honolulu, the volcanic hillside was revered as a place where the faithful could be closer to the ancestral spirits and gods. It served as a sacred altar as late as the reign of King Kamehameha V. The volcanic hillside's religious value was neglected during the urban development after statehood in 1959.

Moanalua High School adopted the menehune as their mascot. In Hawaiian mythology, the Menehune are said to be a people, sometimes described as dwarfs in size, who live in the deep forests and hidden valleys of the Hawaiian Islands, far from the eyes of normal humans. The menehune are believed to have a special relationship with the gods and credited with building dams, temples and other structures throughout the Hawaiian Islands.

Admissions
The school has an attendance zone. Additionally as of May 2012 the school admits about 500-600 students from outside of the attendance zone. A lottery is used to determine which out of boundary students are admitted. In 2004 Gonser wrote that the lottery process was "nail-bitting".

Curriculum
In May 2012 the school had seven Advanced Placement (AP) classes.

The Career and Academic Planning (CAP) program oversees career education classes, each running for 35 minutes and with each student taking at least one each week. The school began this program in 1997.

The Comprehensive School Alienation Program (CSAP), as of May 2012, had about 180-240 students on an annual basis and is used to assist students having difficulty with coursework.

Symbols
Traditionally, the alma mater and anthem are sung during the presentation of the school's flag — a blue crest in the center of a field of blue and trimmed at the edges with white. The school's colors are royal blue and silver.

Demographics
In May 2012 the school had about 2,010 pupils. The students tend to have a higher socioeconomic profile.

The following table represents the number of enrolled students from the years 2003 to 2014.

As of the 2012 school year, the racial/ethnic composition was as follows:
 Asian/Pacific Islander: 61.0%
 White: 14.4%
 Native Hawaiian: 9.4%
 Black: 6.5%
 Hispanic: 3.3%
 American Indian: 0.5%

Moanalua High School serves the children of enlisted personnel and commissioned officers of the United States Air Force, Army, Coast Guard, Marine Corps and Navy. Students who are not military dependents are usually children of professionals living in the Salt Lake and Moanalua subdivisions, neighborhoods that have been classified as upper middle class.

Each graduating class averages 400 students. Approximately sixty percent become enrolled at four-year colleges and universities throughout the nation while thirty percent become enrolled at two-year colleges.  Eight percent go straight to the workforce while four percent join the armed forces. About five percent enroll in technical schools while three percent are usually unsure of their post-graduation plans. Moanalua High School has many valedictorians each year, in comparison to the other schools of the Hawaiʻi State Department of Education. Many students graduate with the honor in a single class, with 20 in 1998.

Academic performance
In 2004 about 80% of the students graduating from Moanalua went to universities and colleges. That year Gonser wrote that the "many success stories" originate from the "personal attention" and "choices" provided by the school's employees to the students.

Sports
With the absence of professional sports teams in Hawaii, the popularity of high school athletics is considerably high in the state. In 2004 the school had 50 sports offered. That year about 800 students participated in those sports.

In the year of Moanalua High School's founding, its athletics department joined the Hawaii High School Athletics Association.  It currently also competes in the Oahu Interscholastic Association, an athletic conference of public schools on the island of Oahu.  Moanalua High School competes in air riflery, baseball, basketball, bowling, canoe paddling, volleyball, cheerleading, cross country, football, golf, judo, soccer, softball, swimming, tennis, track and field, wrestling and water polo.

State Championships 

 Basketball, Boys' - 1996, 1997
 Bowling, Boys' - 1985, 1990, 2004
 Golf, Girls' - 2006
 Golf, Boys' - 2012, 2016, 2018
 Competitive Cheerleading - 2003, 2004, 2005, 2015, 2016, 2018
 Track, Girls' - 1994
 Wrestling, Boys' - 2022
 Wrestling, Girls' - 1999, 2000, 2001, 2022
 Judo, Boys' - 2010, 2011, 2012, 2018, 2019, 2022
 Judo, Girls' - 2018, 2019, 2022
 Air Riflery, Boys' - 2016, 2017, 2019

Music Program
The Music Department consists of a number of various ensembles.  The list includes the Marching Band, the Symphonic Wind Ensemble, Symphony Orchestra, Symphonic Band, Concert Orchestra, Concert Choir, Chorus, Jazz Ensemble, and Concert Band (usually consisting of incoming freshmen). In 2007, the Concert Strings ensemble was introduced into the Music Department.

In May 2012 Hill stated that the orchestra was well reputed.

The school also offers programs in piano and ukulele. These groups, however, do not perform.

In 2013, the school completed and dedicated the first phase of a new performing arts facility.

Marching Band
The Moanalua High School Menehune Marching Band is a marching band program (students grades 9-12) with an established record as being one of the top and largest marching bands in Hawaii. The band is led by directors Elden Seta, Rhona Barbosa, Cavin Takesue and Todd Oshima.

The 240+ member program holds its own marching festival each year known as the Menehune Classic. It also competes in other annual competitions such as the Kamehameha Tournament of Bands, Mililani Trojan Band Fest, the Oahu Interscholastic Association (OIA) Festival, and the Rainbow Invitational. It usually marches in at least one parade each year, such as the Aloha Week parade, and is frequently invited to march in out-of-state parades such as the Tournament of Roses Parade.

The marching band traveled to Osaka, Japan, to march in the Osaka Midosuji Parade. In 2009, the band traveled to Arizona to participate in the Fiesta Bowl Parade.

Symphony Orchestra
The Moanalua High School Symphony Orchestra consists of hand-picked students from grades 9 to 12. The Symphony Orchestra was the first student orchestra to be invited to perform at New York's Carnegie Hall in 1998.  The Symphony Orchestra were invited to perform again on March 20, 2005 at the Isaac Stern Auditorium, receiving a standing ovation in which audience members reportedly yelled, "Good job, Hawaii!" Moanalua High School Symphony Orchestra performed at Carnegie Hall a 3rd time in 2013. In 2018, Moanalua High School Symphony Orchestra attended American String Teachers Association National Orchestra Festival in Atlanta, Georgia. Moanalua High School Symphony Orchestra took first in High School Full Orchestra Division and were overall Grand Champions in the High School Division.

Symphonic Wind Ensemble

The Moanalua High School Symphonic Wind Ensemble consists of the most competent wind and percussion musicians in the Moanalua High School band program. The Symphonic Wind Ensemble has received consistent Superior ratings at the Oahu Band Directors' Association Parade of Bands. The Symphonic Wind Ensemble plays at winter and Aloha Concerts, the OBDA Parade of Bands, and the Central District South Parade of Bands. The Ensemble has also traveled to Japan in the spring of 2004 and winter of 2006 where they represented the United States in the All-Japan Band Festival in Hamamatsu, Japan. More recently, the wind ensemble represented Hawaii in the 2015 Music for All National Festival in Indiana.

JROTC
The school has an Air Force JROTC; in 2004 it was the largest such program in Hawaii.

References

Further reading
  - Includes several articles written by students

External links
 
 
 Moanalua High School Alumni Association
 Moanalua High School Athletics Department
 Moanalua High School Music Department
 Moanalua High School Media Communications Learning Center

Educational institutions established in 1972
Public high schools in Honolulu
1972 establishments in Hawaii